Perch Lake is a reservoir located by Noseville, New York. The Perch River flows through the lake. Perch Lake is shallow, stained, and weedy and the lake bottom is a simple bowl-like structure, with deep silt adjoining the wetlands and sand. Only ice fishing is allowed on the lake. The fish species present are yellow perch, black crappie, bullhead, northern pike, and white sucker. The lake is known to produce northern pike up to 12 pounds.

References 

Lakes of Jefferson County, New York